Zhongliangshan Station is a station on Line 5 of Chongqing Rail Transit in Chongqing municipality, China. It is located in Jiulongpo District and opened in 2021.

Station structure 
There are 2 island platforms at this station. Two outer ones are used for local trains to stop, while express trains passing through the inner tracks.

References

Railway stations in Chongqing
Railway stations in China opened in 2021
Chongqing Rail Transit stations